Carl Johan Calleman, (born 15 May 1950, Stockholm, Sweden), is a toxicologist as well as an author and speaker on the millenarian New Age interpretation of the Mayan calendar known as Mayanism. He differs from professional Mayanists in seeing 28 October 2011 and not 21 December 2012 as a significant date. Calleman does not interpret the date as an apocalypse, Armageddon, or other cataclysmic event but a slow transformation of consciousness in which people experience a higher "unity consciousness."

Life
Calleman studied toxicology at the University of Stockholm in Sweden.
  He has had no professional training in archaeology or the study of the ancient Maya.

He first encountered the Mayan calendar on a visit to Mexico and Guatemala in 1979. He became fascinated with the concept of a calendar that had an "end date" and was influenced by the works of Michael D. Coe.

In 1986 he took a post at the Department of Environmental Health at the University of Washington in Seattle as a cancer researcher. As a result of work done in that post and in China he was appointed as an expert for the World Health Organization on cancer.

In 1993 he returned to Sweden and devoted himself full-time to researching and writing about the calendar. He published a short book in Swedish on the subject in 1994, Mayahypotesen. In 1998 he was invited to be one of the main speakers at a conference about the Mayan calendar in Mérida, Yucatán. This inspired him to write a more widely accessible book, The Mayan Calendar published in 2001. A second popular book The Mayan Calendar and the Transformation of Consciousness followed in 2004, and a third Purposeful Universe: How Quantum Theory and Mayan Cosmology Explain the Origin and Evolution of Life  in 2009.

He lives in Orsa, Sweden and lectures worldwide.

Beliefs
Calleman's beliefs differ from other interpreters of the Mayan calendar and the 2012 phenomenon in that he sees the crucial date for change as 28 October 2011—not 21 December 2012—which he postulates will see the culmination of a series of nine waves of increasing frequency which have influenced, and continue to influence, the development and evolution of both the physical universe and human consciousness.  His ideas represent a revival of theories of unilineal evolution.

Calleman disagrees that 2012 represents the point of an alignment between the Earth's solstice and the galactic centre which he says would be a purely local phenomenon unique to the Earth and which in any case already occurred in 1998. Instead he sees the Mayan calendar as describing the creation process of the whole Universe.

Within the logic of the Mayan Long Count, he says, an auspicious end would have to be on a day which is  13 Ahau in the tzolkin count.  Since 21 December 2012 falls on 4 Ahau this is an unlikely end date. The 28 October 2011 is a 13 Ahau date.

Beginning with the Big Bang he believes creation has continued through a series of waves, each one a factor of 20 times shorter in duration than the one preceding it. Each wave has driven the structure of the universe to a higher level.
The first wave drove the creation of physical matter, the second living cells, the third multicellular life, the fourth organisms living in family groups, the fifth, saw humans in tribal groups, and the sixth in national groups. The seventh wave encompasses human awareness of the whole planet, and the eighth awareness of our place in the galactic structure. The final wave, the ninth and shortest of all, began on 8 March 2011 and will complete along with all the others on 28 October 2011 sees awareness of the whole of the cosmos achieved. Rather than the series ending with an Apocalypse he describes it as the completion of the creation process of the Universe. The way will then be open to the full realisation of consciousness at its highest level which he terms "Unity consciousness".

References

Bibliography
 Mayahypotesen – Svenskarnas roll för Gaias födelse år 2012, (Maya hypothesis – Swedes' role in Gaia's birth in 2012), Carl Johan Calleman (1994).  (Available in pdf in Swedish)
The Mayan Calendar: Solving the Greatest Mystery of Our Time, Carl Johan Calleman, Garev Publishing International (2001) 
The Mayan Calendar and the Transformation of Consciousness, Carl Johan Calleman, Bear & Company (2004). 
Purposeful Universe: How Quantum Theory and Mayan Cosmology Explain the Origin and Evolution of Life, Carl Johan Calleman, Bear & Company (2009). 
The Global Mind and the Rise of Civilization: The Quantum Evolution of Consciousness, 2016, Bear & Company, 
The Nine Waves of Creation: Quantum Physics, Holographic Evolution, and the Destiny of Humanity, 2016, Bear & Company, 
Quantum Science of Psychedelics: The Pineal Gland, Multidimensional Reality, and Mayan Cosmology, 2020, Bear & Company,

External links
 Carl Johan Calleman - The Mayan Calendar Official website

1950 births
2012 phenomenon believers
Living people
New Age writers
Pseudohistorians
Swedish male writers